Janet Jamieson (born April 3, 1927) is a former outfielder who played in the All-American Girls Professional Baseball League. She batted and threw right handed.

Born in Minneapolis, Minnesota, Janet Jamieson was a skilled softball player on a championship team, even though her All-American Girls Professional Baseball League career never really took off afterwards. She appeared in one game with the South Bend Blue Sox during its 1948 season, and went hitless in her only at bat and did not have fielding chances.

Jamieson went into banking after baseball. In addition, she became a nationally ranked table tennis player.

The All-American Girls Professional Baseball League folded in 1954, but there is a permanent display at the Baseball Hall of Fame and Museum at Cooperstown, New York since November 5, 1988, that honors the entire league rather than any individual figure.

Sources

1927 births
Living people
All-American Girls Professional Baseball League players
South Bend Blue Sox players
American female table tennis players
American softball players
Baseball players from Minneapolis
21st-century American women